Martín García and Mariano Hood were the defending champions, but Hood could not compete due to his 1-year ban due to doping. Hood decided to retire from professional tennis instead.

García teamed up with Luis Horna and successfully defended his title by defeating Mariusz Fyrstenberg and Marcin Matkowski 7–6(7–1), 7–6(7–2) in the final. It was the 6th title for García and the 2nd title for Horna in their respective doubles careers.

Seeds

Draw

Draw

References

External links
 Main draw

Campionati Internazionali di Sicilia
2006 ATP Tour
Camp